Berhet is a commune in the Côtes-d'Armor department of Brittany in northwestern France.

Population

Inhabitants of Berhet are called Berhetois in French.

Breton language
The municipality launched a linguistic plan through Ya d'ar brezhoneg on 26 May 2006.

See also
 Communes of the Côtes-d'Armor department

References

External links

 

Communes of Côtes-d'Armor